Andrew Lowe Watson  (17 January 1958 - 25 April 2021) was an English composer for musical theatre and concert music. Along with author Catherine Storr, he wrote the opera Marianne Dreams (2002), based on the children's fantasy novel. It premiered in London in June 2004. He was a student of Norma Fisher.

His eight musicals, commissioned by the Brüder-Grimm-Märchenfestspiele in Hanau, Germany, and based on the Tales of the Brothers Grimm, have been performed in Germany and Japan.

External links 
 Article in "The Independent"
 Composer's Website
  Brüder Grimm Märchenfestspiele, Hanau

Living people
1958 births
English male composers
20th-century English composers
21st-century English composers
20th-century British male musicians
21st-century British male musicians